Darul Barakaat Mosque ("Abode of Blessings" in English) is a large mosque in Bordesley, Birmingham, England. It is run by the Ahmadiyya Muslim Community and was inaugurated by Mirza Masroor Ahmad in  2004.

See also
 Islam in England
 List of mosques in the United Kingdom

References

2004 establishments in England
Ahmadiyya mosques in the United Kingdom
Mosques in Birmingham, West Midlands
Mosques completed in 2004